Olszówka may refer to the following places in Poland:
Olszówka, Lower Silesian Voivodeship (south-west Poland)
Olszówka, Kuyavian-Pomeranian Voivodeship (north-central Poland)
Olszówka, Świętokrzyskie Voivodeship (south-central Poland)
Olszówka, Masovian Voivodeship (east-central Poland)
Olszówka, Koło County in Greater Poland Voivodeship (west-central Poland)
Olszówka, Turek County in Greater Poland Voivodeship (west-central Poland)
Olszówka, Kwidzyn County in Pomeranian Voivodeship (north Poland)
Olszówka, Sztum County in Pomeranian Voivodeship (north Poland)
Olszówka, Tczew County in Pomeranian Voivodeship (north Poland)
Olszówka, Warmian-Masurian Voivodeship (north Poland)
, in Limanowa County; see Gmina Mszana Dolna

See also